Ursmar of Lobbes (died 713) was a missionary bishop in the Meuse and Ardennes region in present-day Belgium, Germany, Luxemburg and France. He was also the first abbot of Lobbes Abbey.

As many missionaries in the 7th and 8th century, he may have been of Irish origin. He was appointed abbot of Lobbes in 691 by the Frankish king Pippin II. He is also credited with the foundation of Aulne Abbey and Wallers Abbey.

Saint Ursmar is a Catholic saint, whose feast day is April 19. His sarcophagus is in the crypt of the parish church in Lobbes (as well as the sarcophagus of his successor, Saint Ermin. A Life was written by Heriger of Lobbes.

Notes

713 deaths
8th-century Frankish bishops
Abbots of Lobbes
Colombanian saints
8th-century Christian saints
Year of birth unknown